Lakeeran is a 2016 Punjabi film produced by Wonderland Amusement Parks Pvt. Ltd. It stars Harman Virk and Yuvika Chaudhary in lead roles with Gurinder Rai, Shivendra Mahal, B.N. Sharma and Nirmal Rishi in pivotal roles.

Remake of Hindi film Tum bin

Plot
The film revolves around a man who accidentally kills another man in Greece  in a car accident. He comes to India where he falls in love with a widow, whose husband had met the same fate.

Cast

Harman Virk
Yuvika Chaudhary 
Shivendra Mahal 
B.N. Sharma 
Nirmal Rishi
 Malkit Rauni
 Gurinder Rai
Satwant Kaur

Music
The music is given by Dr. Zeus, Santosh Kataria. There are 7 songs, including two short folk songs on the plight of destiny, composed by Arif Lohar. The songs are also sung by popular names like Zora Randhawa and Fateh for the modern audiences; while the traditional fans are catered with songs brought by Nachhatar Gill, Jaspinder Narula and Feroz Khan.
"Sada Punjab" (Folk)
"Viah" (Bolea)
"Nima Nima"
"Hok Tappa" - Arif Lohar
"Wonderland"
"Jindey Tappa"
"Okay"

References

External links 
 

2016 films
Punjabi-language Indian films
2010s Punjabi-language films